Robin Eubanks (born October 25, 1955) is an American jazz and jazz fusion slide trombonist, the brother of guitarist Kevin Eubanks and trumpeter Duane Eubanks. His uncles are jazz pianist Ray Bryant and bassist Tommy Bryant. His mother, Vera Eubanks, was famed pianist Kenny Barron's first piano teacher.

Biography
Robin Eubanks was born on October 25, 1955, in Philadelphia. After graduating cum laude from the University of the Arts, he moved to New York City where he first appeared on the jazz scene in the early 1980s. He played with Slide Hampton, Sun Ra, and Stevie Wonder.  Eubanks also the musical director with the jazz drummer Art Blakey and the Jazz Messengers. He also was a member of jazz drummer Elvin Jones Jazz Machine. He was a contributor on fellow jazz trombonist Steve Turre's 2003 release One4J: Paying Homage to J.J. Johnson. Eubanks has also released several albums as a bandleader.

He played for 15 years in double bassist Dave Holland's quintet, sextet, octet and big band. 
J.J. Johnson recommended Eubanks for the position at the Oberlin Conservatory in Ohio, where he taught for 20 years as a tenured professor of Jazz Trombone and Jazz Composition. He has also taught at New England Conservatory and Berklee College of Music in Boston. He was a member in the all-star group the SFJAZZ Collective for 10 years 2008-2019. His notable students include trombonist Andy Hunter of the  WDR Big Band.

Robin is one of the pioneers of M-Base. He has appeared on numerous television shows and specials, including The Tonight Show, Saturday Night Live and The Grammys. he also pioneered the use of electronic effects with the trombone.

Robin is a frequent lecturer, guest soloist and clinician at various colleges and universities in the U.S. and around the world.

Eubanks was voted #1 Trombonist by Down Beat magazine and Jazz Times.

Discography

As leader
Different Perspectives (JMT, 1988)
Dedication (JMT, 1989) - with Steve Turre
Karma (JMT, 1990)
Mental Images (JMT, 1994)
Wake Up Call (Sirocco Jazz, 1997)
Robin Eubanks Sextet: 4: JJ / Slide / Curtis and Al (TCB, 1998)
Mental Images: Get 2 It (REM, 2001)
EB3 Live Vol. 1 (CD and DVD, RKM, 2007)
Robin Eubanks and Mental Images: Klassik RocK Vol. 1 (Artistshare, 2014)
Robin Eubanks and the Mass Line Big Band: More Than Meets The Ear (Artistshare, 2015)

As sideman
With Geri Allen
Open on All Sides in the Middle (Minor Music, 1987)
The Gathering (Verve, 1998)
With Art Blakey
Not Yet (Soul Note, 1988)
I Get a Kick Out of Bu (Soul Note, 1988)
With Steve Coleman
World Expansion (JMT, 1987)
With Sonny Fortune
A Better Understanding (Blue Note, 1995)
With Craig Handy
Split Second Timing (Arabesque, 1992)
Reflections in Change (Sirocco Music, 1999)
With Joe Henderson
Big Band (1996)
With Dave Holland
The Razor's Edge (ECM, 1987)
Points of View (ECM, 1998)
Prime Directive (ECM, 1999)
What Goes Around (ECM, 2002)
Not for Nothin' (ECM, 2001)
Extended Play: Live at Birdland (ECM, 2003)
Pathways (Dare2, 2010)
With Ronald Shannon Jackson 
Decode Yourself (Island, 1985)
With Elvin Jones
The Truth: Heard Live at the Blue Note (Half Note, 1999)
With Bobby Previte
Weather Clear, Track Fast (Enja, 1991)
Slay the Suitors (Avant, 1993)
Hue and Cry (Enja, 1993)
With Hank Roberts
Black Pastels (JMT, 1988)
With Herb Robertson
Shades of Bud Powell (JMT, 1988)
With others
Kenny Drew: Follow the Spirit (Sirocco Jazz, 2000)
Bill Hardman: What's Up (SteepleChase, 1989)
Andrew Hill: But Not Farewell (Blue Note, 1990)
Abdullah Ibrahim: Good News from Africa: Portrait (Enja, 1990)
Joe Jackson: Symphony No. 1 (Sony Classical, 1999)
J. J. Johnson: The Brass Orchestra (PolyGram, 1996)
The Uniphonics: Crawl (2010)
B.B. King: Live at the Apollo (MCA, 1990)
Mingus Big Band: Essential Mingus Big Band (Dreyfus, 1996)
Barbra Streisand: The Concert (Sony, 1994)
Sun Ra: Other Side of the Sun (Universe, 1978)
Superblue: Superblue 2 (Blue Note, 1989)
Talking Heads: Naked (Sire, 1988)
McCoy Tyner Big Band: Uptown/Downtown (Milestone, 1988)
McCoy Tyner: Uptown/Downtown (WEA, 2000)
Grover Washington Jr.: All My Tomorrows (Sony, 1994)
Sadao Watanabe: Remembrance (Verve, 1999)
Chip White: Harlem Sunset (Postcards, 1994)

References

External links 
Official site
 Paul Olson, "Robin Eubanks: Master Trombonist... And Would-Be Rock Guitarist?", Allaboutjazz, November 12, 2007.
 Josef Woodard, "Robin, Kevin & Duane Eubanks: Wake-Up Call", JazzTimes, July 1, 2001.
 
 

1955 births
Living people
African-American musicians
American jazz trombonists
Male trombonists
The Jazz Messengers members
Musicians from Philadelphia
New England Conservatory faculty
Jazz musicians from Pennsylvania
21st-century trombonists
American male jazz musicians
SFJAZZ Collective members
Superblue (band) members
JMT Records artists
ArtistShare artists
Central High School (Philadelphia) alumni